Goldblatt is a surname, meaning "gold leaf" in the German language. Notable people named Goldblatt include:

David Goldblatt, South African photographer
Harry Goldblatt, American physician internationally known for his research in high blood pressure
Hilda Goldblatt Gorenstein, artist and inspiration for the documentary I Remember Better When I Paint
Mark Goldblatt, American cinema editor
Max Goldblatt, American actor, son of Mark Goldblatt
Peter Goldblatt, South African botanist
Rose Goldblatt, Canadian administrator, pianist and teacher
Scott Goldblatt, American swimmer
Robert Goldblatt, New Zealand philosopher and mathematician
Goldblatt's, Chicago based department store
Stephen Goldblatt, American artist and animator

Jewish surnames
German-language surnames
Yiddish-language surnames